The Movie Game may refer to:

 The Movie Game (UK TV series), a 1988-1996 British game show
 The Movie Game (U.S. TV series), a 1969-1972 American game show hosted first by Sonny Fox, then by Larry Blyden